Chen Jue, once named Chen Bingxiang, (1903 -October 14, 1928) was a martyr who sacrificed his life in the early years of the revolution led by the Chinese Communist Party (CCP). He and his wife, Zhao Yunxiao, were a martyr couple who devoted their lives to the CCP.

Personal Experience
Chen Jue was born in Liling, in the east of Hunan province in 1903. He began to study in a private school when he was 7. In 1922, he entered the prefectural high school of LiLing. Two years later, in 1924, he joined the Communist Youth League of China and was elected as the chairman of the student association of prefectural high school of Liling. In 1925, he joined the Chinese Communist Party. Then in September, he went to study in Moscow Sun Yat-sen University where he met his wife.

Family
His wife, Zhao Yunxiao, was also a martyr. They met each other when they were studying in Moscow, where they were married. During the simple wedding, they sworn to devote their lives to the revolution of China. They returned Hunan from Moscow in September, 1927. After Chen was killed, his wife gave birth to their daughter in February, 1929. Zhao was soon killed on March 24, 1929. Then their baby daughter was fostered by Chen's parent. But unfortunately, their daughter died at the age of 4 because of her weakness.

Political and patriotic activities
When he and his wife returned from Moscow, China was under the rule of the Kuomintang. During that period, the Kuomintang committed a lot of wanton assassinations. In such a dangerous situation, they were sent to work in Hunan after returning from Moscow. In November 1927, he was sent to work in Liling with his wife. Under the leadership of the CCP, he took part in the guerrilla action of Liling and founding the communist government of Liling. In April 1928, he and his wife were sent to Changsha to work in Hunan provincial commission of the CCP. And in the summer of this year, he went to Changde to work as a secret agent of the CCP.

His death
While he was working at the Secret Agent Committee of Changde in 1928, he was betrayed by a colleague. Then he was arrested by the Kuomintang. When he was put on trial, he cursed the military commander Chen Jiayou. The commander was shamed into anger, but he did not have the authority to kill him. So then he was delivered to Changsha to have another trial. Although he was brutally tortured, he had never leaked any secrets of CCP. At last, he was killed by the Kuomintang.

References 

1903 births
1928 deaths
Chinese Communist Party politicians from Hunan
Martyrs
People executed by the Republic of China
Republic of China politicians from Hunan
Politicians from Zhuzhou
Executed Republic of China people
20th-century executions by China
Executed people from Hunan
Chinese expatriates in the Soviet Union